Leander was launched at  Whitehaven in 1813. Initially she traded as a West Indiaman and then more widely. She was wrecked in July 1822 at the Cape of Good Hope.

Career
Leander first appeared in Lloyd's Register (LR) in 1814 with Middleton, master and owner, and trade Whitehaven–West Indies.

Fate
Leander, Middleton, master, put into Cork on 17 March 1822. She was on her way from London to the Cape of Good Hope, but had sprung her mast.

On 21–22 July 1822 Leander was driven ashore at the Cape of Good Hope. Captain Middleton and a seaman were drowned when the boat they were in overturned as they were leaving the wreck of Leander. A letter dated 10 August reported that the greater part of Leanders cargo had been saved, but that she had been condemned.

Citations and references
Citations

References

1813 ships
Age of Sail merchant ships of England
Maritime incidents in July 1822